John Cohen (August 2, 1932 – September 16, 2019) was an American musician, photographer and film maker who performed and documented the traditional music of the rural South and played a major role in the American folk music revival. In the 1950s and 60s, Cohen was a founding member of the New Lost City Ramblers, a New York-based string band. Cohen  made several expeditions to Peru to film and record the traditional culture of the Q'ero, an indigenous people. Cohen was also a professor of visual arts at SUNY Purchase College for 25 years.

Life and career

Early life 
Cohen was born in Queens, New York, where his father, Israel, owned a shoe store. Throughout most of his life John grew up in the eastern parts of Long Island where he learned to play the guitar and banjo. He later attended Yale University where he studied painting. He later on met one of his good friends Tom Paley. They began organizing small concerts for people on their universities campus. Later on, he and Tom both moved to New York City and formed the New Lost City Ramblers. This newly formed band introduced several generations of musicians and audiences to the music styles of rural string bands from the 1920s and '30s.

When living in New York John was in the heart of a diverse world of art and music forms. He began taking photos of many painters and artists around the area and this brought in his love for photography.

College career 
In 1958, Cohen formed the New Lost City Ramblers with Mike Seeger and Tom Paley. In 1962, Paley was replaced by Tracy Schwarz. The Ramblers introduced young urban folk music fans to the work of rural performers such as Dock Boggs, Elizabeth Cotten and Blind Alfred Reed. The influence of the Ramblers has been compared to Harry Smith's Anthology of American Folk Music. It has been suggested that The Grateful Dead song "Uncle John's Band", released on the album Workingman's Dead, was about Cohen and his band. Cohen called this "a true rumor."

Cohen described the outlook of the Ramblers: “We made it possible for urban-based musicians to step out of the demands of the music business and look out into America to get in touch with the genuine energy, drive and craziness out there.” Rather than pursuing commercial success through a polished sound, Cohen and the Ramblers undertook numerous research field trips to the South.

Photography/ Film Career 
John Cohen had taken photos and pursued photography for many years. Cohen also enjoyed filmmaking. He created a film called The High Lonesome Sound. This documentary shows the many emotions of life among the poor in those times. It illustrates how music and religion helped people in the Appalachian region maintain hope and traditions during hard times.

In 1962, Cohen returned to Kentucky, where he spent six weeks filming the documentary The High Lonesome Sound which centred on Roscoe Holcomb. (The title of the film became synonymous with the Appalachian music he captured.) Cohen subsequently recorded Dillard Chandler and made the documentary The End of an Old Song about Chandler and his world. With Ralph Rinzler and Izzy Young, Cohen created the organization Friends of Old Time Music. They produced a string of concerts featuring traditional musicians in New York in the 1960s

In 1959 he worked as an assistant photographer to Robert Frank and participated in the production of his film Pull My Daisy, the Beat Generation film directed by Frank and Alfred Leslie, written by Jack Kerouac and featuring Allen Ginsberg, Peter Orlovsky , David Amram, and Gregory Corso. In New York, John was at the center of wildly diverse worlds of art and music. He photographed poets Allen Ginsberg and Gregory Corso; painters Franz Kline and Red Grooms; and a young Bob Dylan, who had just arrived in the city. Influenced by Frank, Cohen photographed the Abstract Expressionist painters and Beat writers who congregated in artists' studios and at the Cedar Tavern. Once out there in the world, John got in contact with Life Magazine, and Life paid him for early publication rights of his "beat generation" photos.

Cohen learnt about weaving customs of Peru through an archaeology course at Yale. He travelled to the Peruvian Andes in 1956 to write his master's thesis on their weaving techniques. Cohen visited Peru eight times between 1956 and 2005. His work in Peru included audio recordings of Andean music and documentary films as well as books about weaving, music, festivals, and dance. Cohen's recording of a Peruvian wedding song was included on the Voyager Golden Record which was attached to the Voyager spacecraft in 1977.

Cohen ceased to perform with the New Lost City Ramblers in the 1970s, though they would re-unite for a 20th anniversary concert at New York's Carnegie Hall in 1978 and for a 35th anniversary tour in 1993. From 1972 to 1997, Cohen was a Professor of Visual Arts at SUNY Purchase College where he taught photography and drawing.

John made 15 films, including The High Lonesome Sound (1963), Sara and Maybelle: The Carter Family (1981), and Mountain Music of Peru (1984). He himself was the subject of the Smithsonian Channel's 2009 film Play On, John: A Life in Music

Music career 
In spring 1959, Cohen went to Hazard, Kentucky in search of traditional musicians. A series of chance encounters led him to Roscoe Holcomb who played "Across the Rocky Mountain". "My hair stood up on end," Cohen recalled. "It was the most moving, touching, dynamic, powerful song. Not the song itself, but the way he sang it was just astounding." Cohen's recording trip resulted in the album, Mountain Music of Kentucky, released on the Folkways label.

In 1998, Cohen released his first solo album, Stories the Crow Told Me. Steve Leggett wrote in AllMusic that the record is "not so much a redefinition of Appalachian music as it is an attempt to enter it fully and completely. Cohen does this so well that the album sounds exactly like some great, lost Alan Lomax field tape, and although by definition what Cohen has done here is a facsimile, it sounds so much like the real deal that it hardly matters."

Cohen was associate music producer on the movie Cold Mountain (2003), working with T Bone Burnett. Cohen appeared in the Martin Scorsese documentary about Bob Dylan, No Direction Home (2005), describing Dylan's development in the context of the 1960s folk music revival. From 2008 onwards Cohen performed with The Down Hill Strugglers, an old-time string band featuring younger performers. In 2009, the Smithsonian Channel released a documentary about Cohen, Play On, John: A Life in Music.

In 2011, the Library of Congress acquired the John Cohen archive of manuscripts, films, photographs and audio recordings. Cohen's archive includes interviews with Harry Smith, Roger McGuinn, Pete Seeger, Bob Dylan, Gary Davis and Roscoe Holcomb. The photographs include these artists and Willie Dixon, Woody Guthrie, Alan Lomax, Bill Monroe, The Stanley Brothers, Merle Travis, Muddy Waters and many others.

Cohen resided in Putnam Valley, New York.

Through the 1960s, John continued to make albums for Folkways. The artists included ballad singer Dillard Chandler, “Singing Miner” George Davis, and Roscoe Holcomb. Most of John's recordings of Roscoe can be heard on two Smithsonian Folkways CDs, The High Lonesome Sound and An Untamed Sense of Control. John's 1953 recordings of Reverend Gary Davis were released by Smithsonian Folkways on the 2003 CD If I had My Way. In 1998, Cohen released his first solo album, Stories the Crow Told Me. Cohen was associate music producer on the movie Cold Mountain (2003), working with T Bone Burnett.

Personal life

In 1965 Cohen married Penny Seeger, a member of the musical Seeger family. They had a daughter, Sonya Cohen Cramer, a singer who died in 2015, and a son, Rufus. Penny accompanied her husband to Peru and collaborated on recording music. She died in 1993.

Monographs 
There Is No Eye: John Cohen Photographs, introduction by Greil Marcus. New York: powerHouse Books, 2001. , 
Young Bob: John Cohen’s Early Photographs of Bob Dylan, Brooklyn: powerHouse Books, 2003. 
Past, Present, Peru, Göttingen, Germany: Steidl, 2010. 
The High & Lonesome Sound: The Legacy of Roscoe Holcomb, Göttingen, Germany: Steidl, 2012. 
Here and Gone: Bob Dylan & Woody Guthrie & the 1960s, Göttingen, Germany: Steidl, 2014. 
Walking In the Light, Göttingen, Germany: Steidl, 2015. 
Cheap Rents…and de Kooning Göttingen, Germany: Steidl, 2016.

Recent publications 
Beat Generation: New York, San Francisco, Paris, Paris, France: Centre Pompidou, 2016. 
Pull My Daisy, Paris, France: Editions Macula and Centre Pompidou, 2016. Text by Rollet, Patrice; Sargeant, Jack. 
 Petrus, Stephen and Cohen, Ronald. Folk City: New York and the American Folk Music Revival, New York: Oxford University Press, 2015. Foreword by Peter Yarrow. 
Glimcher, Mildred L.Happenings: New York, 1958-1963, New York: The Monacelli Press LLC. 2012

Selected filmography 
The High Lonesome Sound (1962). Streaming on Folkstreams
Fifty Miles from Times Square (1970)
The End of an Old Song (1972).  A DVD version is in print as part of Dark Holler: Old Love Songs and Ballads (2005-09-27). Washington: Smithsonian Folkways. Streaming on Folkstreams.
Musical Holdouts (1975) Streaming on Folkstreams.
Q'eros: The Shape of Survival (1979)
Peruvian Weaving: a continuous warp (1980)
Sara and Maybelle (1981)
Gypsies Sing Long Ballads (1982), streaming on Folkstreams
Mountain Music of Peru (1984)
Dancing with the Incas (1990)
Carnival in Q'eros (1992)
Play on John: A Life in Music (2009) on Smithsonian Networks
Visions of Mary Frank (2014)

Selected discography (as producer) 
High Atmosphere: Ballads and Banjo Tunes from Virginia and North Carolina (1975)
There Is No Eye: Music for Photographs, Smithsonian Folkways SFW CD 40091 (2001), companion to the book
Back Roads to Cold Mountain (2004)

References

External links

John Cohen representation at L. Parker Stephenson Photographs
Folkstreams: The High Lonesome Sound (1963); The End of an Old Song (1969); Musical Holdouts (1975); Gypsies Sing Long Ballads (1982)
Webcast of a Library of Congress presentation, "'The High Lonesome Sound Revisited': Documenting Traditional Culture in America" (2009)

The Down Hill Strugglers
Oldtone Roots Music Festival Tribute Video by Fred Robbins

1932 births
2019 deaths
American folk singers
American photographers
Appalachian music
Musicians from Queens, New York